ESTC may refer to:

 English Short Title Catalogue
 Lisbon Theatre and Film School (ESTC - Escola Superior de Teatro e Cinema)